Rua Isobel Gardner  (13 March 1901 – 25 May 1972) was a New Zealand teacher and principal. She was born in Devonport, Auckland, New Zealand, on 13 March 1901.

In the 1968 New Year Honours, Gardner was appointed an Officer of the Order of the British Empire, for services to education.

References

1901 births
1972 deaths
New Zealand educators
People from Auckland
New Zealand Officers of the Order of the British Empire